{{Speciesbox
| image = Roperia poulsoni (43380984602).jpg
| taxon = Roperia poulsoni
| authority = (Carpenter, 1864)
| synonyms_ref = 
| synonyms = 
 'Fusus roperi Dall, 1898
 Ocenebra poulsoni Carpenter, 1864
}}Roperia poulsoni is a species of sea snail, a marine gastropod mollusk in the family Muricidae, the murex snails or rock snails.Roperia poulsoni is the only species in the genus Roperia.Ocenebra poulsoni'' is the basionym, but this species has been placed in a separate genus because of its distinctive radula.

References

External links
 

Ocenebrinae
Gastropods described in 1864